Santa María Island is a sparsely inhabited Chilean island located off the coast of Coronel. Santa María Island has been witness to important events in the history of Chile and the world.

History
Santa María Island was called Tralca or Penequen by their Mapuche inhabitants and she was discovered, for the Europeans, by Juan Bautista Pastene possibly seen in 1544, but in any case in 1550, during his second voyage.

Thomas Cavendish sacked and looted the dependencies in 1586, during his first voyage.

Later, also pirates from Netherlands, Joris van Spilbergen, Simon de Cordes, Hendrik Brouwer anchored at the island and they were supplied with fresh water and wood.

In 1642, the Dutch East India Company joined the Dutch West Indies Company in organizing an expedition to Chile to establish a base for their trade at the west coast of South America. Valdivia, Chiloé Island and Santa María Island came into consideration because they were isolated from Chile but with harbours. Valdivia, like all cities south of Bío Bío River, had been abandoned by Spaniards and destroyed by the Mapuches in 1599 during the Destruction of the Seven Cities.

The fleet sailed from Dutch Brazil where John Maurice of Nassau provided them with supplies. After landing on Chiloe Island, Brouwer made a pact with the Mapuche, in permanent War of Arauco against Spain, to aid in establishing a resettlement at Valdivia. However, on August 7, 1643, Hendrik died (at the age of 62) before arriving, and was succeeded by his vice-admiral Elias Herckman, who landed at the ruins of Valdivia on August 24. Brouwer was buried in the new settlement, which Herckman named Brouwershaven after him. Herckman and his men occupied the location only until October 28, 1643.  Having been told that the Dutch had plans to return to the location,  the Spanish viceroy in Peru sent 1000 men in twenty ships (and 2000 men by land, who never made it) in 1644 to resettle Valdivia and fortify it. The Spanish soldiers in the new garrison disinterred and burned Brouwer's body.

In order to prevent the use of the island by pirates, the Spaniards destroyed and set fire to the buildings in the Santa María Island.

On 26 October 1818 anchored at the island the First Chilean Navy Squadron under the command of Manuel Blanco Encalada and captured several ships of a Spanish convoy carrying men and weapons for El Callao.

On 1 November 1914, the Battle of Coronel was fought off Santa María Island. HMS Good Hope was sunk with the loss of all lives approximately 10 miles west of the island.

On 22 April 1924, the SV Garthwray ran aground on Santa María Island in a fog. The Garthwray was noteworthy for having been dismasted by squalls off of Cape Horn in two consecutive attempts to pass the cape from east to west in 1922 and 1923.

Tourism
The South American sea lion can be found on its coast.

Literature
The island is the place where the Herman Melville novel Benito Cereno takes place.

Geology
The 2010 Chile earthquake elevated the island 1.8 m.

See also
 Pirate

References

External links
 Municipalidad de Coronel, Isla Santa María

Islands of Biobío Region
Pacific islands of Chile
Coasts of Biobío Region